Louis Desprez (1799–1870) was a French sculptor.

Born in Paris, he was a pupil of Francois Joseph Bosio. He went to Rome after winning the Prix de Rome for Sculpture in 1826. He was principally distinguished for his busts and portrait statues.

References
 L'œuvre sculpté de Louis Desprez (1799-1870), Julie Pinaton. Villeneuve d'Ascq : Dactylogramme, 2003, 2 vol. (75-13p.-66 p. de pl.). Maîtrise : Histoire de l'Art : Lille 3 : 2003, sous la direction de M. Chappey. Bibliogr. p. 69-70.

External links
 

19th-century French sculptors
French male sculptors
Prix de Rome for sculpture
1799 births
1870 deaths
Artists from Paris
19th-century French male artists